Adolphe Lefkowitch (July 23, 1902 – April 15, 1987) was an American boxer who competed in the 1924 Summer Olympics. He was born in Newport News, Virginia. In 1924 he was eliminated in the second round of the middleweight class after losing his fight to Leslie Black.

References

External links
Adolphe Lefkowitch's profile at Sports Reference.com

1902 births
1987 deaths
Sportspeople from Newport News, Virginia
Boxers from Virginia
Middleweight boxers
Olympic boxers of the United States
Boxers at the 1924 Summer Olympics
American male boxers